The Caerhendy television relay station was sited at Caerhendy in the Afan Valley, a few kilometres north of Junction 40 on the M4 motorway at Port Talbot. It was originally built in the 1980s as a fill-in relay for UHF analogue television. It was sited at the clubhouse of the soccer ground at Ynys Park and consisted of a mere 3 m aluminium mast carrying a vertically stacked yagi array. The transmitter served about 50 houses in Caerhendy, about 500 m across the valley to the east, which for reasons of geography couldn't get a signal from Mynydd Emroch transmitter just to the south.

Alltwen transmitter re-radiated a signal received off-air from Cwmafan about 2 km farther to the northeast, itself a relay of Wenvoe. It was possibly the lowest ERP officially provided TV relay in the UK, radiating just 0.5 W on each of its four UHF channels.

When it came, the digital switchover process rendered Caerhendy redundant. It is no longer in service.

Channels listed by frequency

Analogue television

1980s - March 2010
Caerhendy (being in Wales) transmitted the S4C variant of Channel 4.

References

External links
The Transmission Gallery: Caerhendy
UKFree: Caerhendy TV transmitter

Transmitter sites in Wales
Wenvoe UHF 625-line Transmitter Group